Sydney Arthur Orchard (12 December 1875 – 19 April 1947) was a New Zealand rugby union player, referee and administrator, and cricket player and administrator.

Early life and family
Orchard was born in Elmore, VIctoria, Australia on 12 December 1875. He emigrated to New Zealand with his family in 1886.

Rugby union
He was a member of the New Zealand national side in 1896 and 1897, playing eight matches, including two games against each of New South Wales and Queensland. After retiring as a player, Orchard served on the management committee of the Canterbury Rugby Union, and was also a referee.

Cricket
Orchard played first-class cricket in New Zealand for Canterbury between 1895 and 1913. In 1909–10 Orchard took a hat-trick for Canterbury against Auckland in Auckland. After his playing career ended he managed the New Zealand team that toured Australia in 1913–14, and was sole selector for the two matches New Zealand played at home against Australia later that season.

His great-grandson Mark Orchard played cricket for the Northern Districts Knights.

References

1875 births
1947 deaths
Sportsmen from Victoria (Australia)
Australian emigrants to New Zealand
New Zealand international rugby union players
New Zealand rugby union players
Manawatu rugby union players
Canterbury rugby union players
Rugby union wings
Rugby union fullbacks
New Zealand rugby union referees
Canterbury cricketers
New Zealand cricketers
New Zealand cricket administrators
New Zealand national cricket team selectors